Kjerstin Wøyen Funderud (born 13 November 1970) is a Norwegian politician.

She was elected representative to the Storting from the constituency of Østfold for the period 2021–2025, for the Centre Party.

Funderud served as mayor in Våler from 2007 to 2011.

References

1970 births
Living people
Østfold politicians
Centre Party (Norway) politicians
Members of the Storting
Women members of the Storting
Mayors of places in Østfold